Hereditary progressive mucinous histiocytosis is a very rare, benign, non-Langerhans' cell histiocytosis.  An autosomal dominant or X-linked hereditary disease described on the skin, it has been found almost exclusively in women.  One case of the disease in a male patient has been reported.

See also 
 Non-X histiocytosis

References

External links 

Monocyte- and macrophage-related cutaneous conditions